The 1918 Vancouver Island earthquake occurred in British Columbia, Canada at 12:41 a.m. Pacific Standard Time on December 6.
The earthquake was most likely of the strike-slip type, and was estimated to have a maximum perceived intensity of VII (Very strong) on the Mercalli intensity scale. The epicenter was located east of the Stewardson inlet on the west coast of Vancouver Island, with damage occurring at the Estevan Point lighthouse on the Hesquiat Peninsula. The event registered 7.2 on the moment magnitude scale and was felt as far as northern Washington state and the interior of British Columbia.

The source of the earthquake was the Nootka transform fault, which separates the Juan de Fuca and Explorer plates and has been the origin of at least five additional moderate to large events since 1918.

See also
List of earthquakes in 1918
List of earthquakes in Canada
1946 Vancouver Island earthquake

References

Bibliography

External links

Vancouver Island Earthquake, 1918
Vancouver Island Earthquake, 1918
1918 Vancouver
1918 disasters in Canada